Shanu Saini (born 30 June 1997) is an Indian cricketer. He made his List A debut on 17 February 2018, for Uttar Pradesh in the 2017–18 Vijay Hazare Trophy. He made his Twenty20 debut on 12 November 2019, for Uttar Pradesh in the 2019–20 Syed Mushtaq Ali Trophy.

References

External links
 

1997 births
Living people
Indian cricketers
Uttar Pradesh cricketers
Place of birth missing (living people)